Josefina Loisa Francisco Andalio (born April 21, 1999), better known as Loisa Andalio, is a Filipino actress, dancer and singer. She was first seen on Philippine TV in April 2014 as a housemate of the fifth regular season of Pinoy Big Brother, Pinoy Big Brother: All In, where she was dubbed as the "Talented Darling ng Parañaque". She was the last housemate to be evicted from the house, one place short of making the final Big Four.

Career
Andalio started out as a member of a sing and dance girl group called 3G, formed in 2013.

In 2014, she became one of the 18 housemates in Pinoy Big Brother: All In, the fifth regular and eleventh overall season of Pinoy Big Brother which showcased various people from celebrities to regular housemates competing for the ultimate title as the PBB Big Winner. Andalio was declared as the last evictee on August 23, just one place short from making the Big 4.

In an interview on August 29, 2014 with Kris Aquino on Aquino & Abunda Tonight, Andalio revealed she would be starring in a new teleserye together with fellow ex-housemates Joshua Garcia and Jane Oineza, alongside Vina Morales, Denise Laurel and Christian Vasquez. This series was Nasaan Ka Nang Kailangan Kita where she played Beatrice "Bea" Natividad, which aired from January 19 to October 16, 2015.

Andalio appeared in two films as a supporting character in the films Crazy Beautiful You as Mia and Gandarrapiddo: The Revenger Squad as Velle.

She is a former member of the all-girl dance group GirlTrends who perform on It's Showtime and is currently a member of BFF5 together with Maris Racal, Kira Balinger, Ylona Garcia and Andrea Brillantes.

She was one of the cast of the Primetime Series My Dear Heart playing the role of Agatha Estanislao, the sister of Bela Padilla's character.

In 2017 as part of the 25th year of Star Magic together with Julia Barretto, Liza Soberano, Kathryn Bernardo, Janella Salvador, Maris Racal, Sofia Andres, Sue Ramirez, Alexa Ilacad, Ylona Garcia, Andrea Brillantes and Kira Balinger, they were featured as the cover girls of the June 2017 issue of Metro Magazine as the "twelve hottest" young stars of Star Magic.

She was cast on the primetime television series The Good Son playing the role of Hazel.

In 2018, her song "Sasamahan Kita" was released which is gadget-oriented incorporated.

Personal life
Andalio was born to parents Leonardo Q. Andalio and Sandie F. Andalio.

Filmography

Television

Film

Discography

Singles

Awards and nominations

References

External links

Living people
People from Parañaque
Actresses from Metro Manila
Tagalog people
Pinoy Big Brother contestants
Participants in Philippine reality television series
Star Magic personalities
ABS-CBN personalities
Filipino child actresses
Filipino television actresses
21st-century Filipino women singers
Star Music artists
1999 births